Foundation for God's Glory (FGG) is a non-profit corporation registered in the State of New York. It is exempted from Federal income tax under section 501(c)(3) of the Internal Revenue Code. The Internal Revenue Service classified it as a private operating foundation described in section 4942(j)(3) of the Code. Its founder and executive director is Dante Raul "DR" Teodoro.

Mission

FGG's mission is to improve the quality of life of the underprivileged by empowering them through scholarship grants, hunger alleviation and disaster relief projects.

History

FGG was founded in 2004 in response to the success of Juno Healthcare Staffing Systems, Inc., a recruitment staffing that Dante Raul "DR" Teodoro, his wife Nonita "NT" Teodoro and their daughter Charm Teodoro started in 2001. Through FGG, the Teodoro family developed an effective means of organizing their acts of charity to give back to the community.

Because of the foundation's contributions to society, DR Teodoro received two awards, namely, the Twenty Outstanding Filipinos Abroad Award for 2008  and the Humanitarian Leadership Award for 2007.  NT Teodoro was also honored with the New York Women of Excellence Award.

Since launching its programs in the Philippines in 2005, FGG has distributed 400 bags of relief to 180 families who were struck by natural disasters such as the mudslide in Leyte and the Typhoon Chanchu victims in Mindoro.  FGG also graduated 72 scholars from Metro Manila, Northern Luzon and the Visayas. FGG set up 4 feeding centers to feed undernourished children, conducted three medical missions, and sponsored livelihood workshops in urban poor communities. In the US, FGG sent financial support to aid the people affected by Hurricane Katrina, and fed 60 South American indigent migrants in New Jersey. FGG regularly sent volunteers to help feed the homeless in New York City, and gives monthly financial support to 19 US-based Christian ministries. For school year 2008-2009, FGG is supporting 95 students who were given scholarships to study in 4 church planting and evangelism courses that are conducted in Metro Manila and Baguio, Philippines.

References

External links
 JUNO Healthcare Staffing Systems, Inc.
 Foundation For God's Glory

Charities based in New York (state)
Christian charities based in the United States
Poverty-related organizations
Christian organizations established in 2004